The Accidental Detective is a 2015 South Korean action comedy film directed by Kim Joung-hoon. It was released on September 24, 2015. The crux of the film is loosely inspired from Strangers on a Train. A sequel has been made - The Accidental Detective 2: In Action, released on June 13, 2018.

Plot
A true-crime enthusiast, Dae-Man (Kwon Sang-Woo) and a Sr. Detective Noh (Sung Dong-Il) now demoted under his Jr. investigate together to find the true murderer their friend is accused of.

Cast
Kwon Sang-woo as Kang Dae-man
Sung Dong-il as Noh Tae-soo
Seo Young-hee as Mi-Ok (Dae-Man's wife)
Lee Il-hwa as Noh's wife
Park Hae-Joon as Joon-Soo
Lee Seung-Joon as Kim Yong-Gyu 
Jo Bok-Rae as Lee Yoo-No 
Kwon-hyeok as Han Tae-woong
Yoon Kyung-ho as Detective Ma

References

External links
 

2015 action comedy films
South Korean action comedy films
South Korean buddy comedy films
South Korean crime action films
2010s crime comedy films
Police detective films
2015 crime action films
2010s police comedy films
2010s buddy comedy films
South Korean detective films
South Korean police films
Films set in South Korea
2015 comedy films
2010s South Korean films
2010s Korean-language films